The 1937 Montana Grizzlies football team represented the University of Montana in the 1937 college football season as a member of the Pacific Coast Conference (PCC). The Grizzlies were led by third-year head coach Doug Fessenden, played their home games at Dornblaser Field and finished the season with a record of seven wins and one loss (7–1, 0–1 PCC).

Schedule

References

Montana
Montana Grizzlies football seasons
Montana Grizzlies football